Shepley railway station serves the villages of Shepley and Shelley in West Yorkshire, England. It lies on the Penistone Line operated by Northern. Opened by the Lancashire and Yorkshire Railway in 1850, it is located at the southern end of one of the two passing loops on the otherwise single track section between Barnsley and Huddersfield.

The station layout is slightly unusual in that the platforms are staggered (on the opposite sides of a road bridge, as can be seen in the accompanying photo) rather than being located opposite each other like other stations on the route. The station once had a goods yard which has now been converted to housing; its main building on the northbound platform still stands, but is not in rail use.

Facilities

In August 2013, plans were released to install electronic real-time information screens (CIS) at the station. It was later revealed by Metro that they will be installed by January/February 2015. These were eventually commissioned in the spring of 2015. The station has been unstaffed since 1966, and has a ticket machine. There are basic shelters on both platforms and each has step-free access.

Services
Until 2017, services operated two-hourly each way on Sundays but since then they run hourly as during the week.

References

External links

Railway stations in Kirklees
DfT Category F2 stations
Former Lancashire and Yorkshire Railway stations
Northern franchise railway stations
Railway stations in Great Britain opened in 1850
Kirkburton